Robert Cavanah is a Scottish stage and film actor, writer, director and producer.

Biography

Robert Cavanah was born in Edinburgh. He attended James Gillespie's High School in Edinburgh followed by the Royal Scottish Academy of Music and Drama in 1986.  However, he left after just one term but went on to graduate from a three-year acting course at Drama Centre London in 1994, part of the University of the Arts London.

He now lives in Kent.

Career

Filmmaking

Cavanah wrote, produced and directed the short films Soldier's Leap (1999), Fish (2001), and Trumps (2001).

He made his directorial feature film debut in Pimp  (2010), which he wrote and in which he also starred.

He established a film production company called R&R Films (later R&R Film) along with Royd Tolkien in 2010, which was operational until 2016. 

He produced and directed the documentaries There's A Hole In My Bucket and The Big Hope.

Acting

Film and television
He played Adam Carnegie in the ITV1 drama series The Royal for three series and played Tommy Grant in the BBC1 soap opera EastEnders. He starred in the 1998 ITV version of Wuthering Heights as Heathcliff. He played Ian in Emmerdale and guest starred on the second series of Outlander shot in 2015.

His film acting credits include Soccer Mom, Birthday, Fall of the Essex Boys, AB Negative, Lara Croft Tomb Raider: The Cradle of Life, and Sahara.

Starring roles include Cracker, Blue Dove, Cadfael, Hamish MacBeth, Kavanagh QC, Rose and Maloney, Rebus, Silent Witness, Highlander: The Raven, Casualty, DCI Banks, Waterloo Road, The Bill, The Governor,  The Borgias, Shetland, Hatfields & McCoys and as Robert Stevenson in the BBC television drama-documentary series Seven Wonders of the Industrial World which chronicled the design and construction of the Bell Rock Lighthouse.

Theatre
He appeared at the Royal National Theatre in 2010/11 in the Ena Lamont Stewart play Men Should Weep in the role of John Morrison alongside Sharon Small. He played the title role in MacBeth at the Octagon Theatre, Bolton, directed by David Thacker (February 2012).

In 2015–16, Cavanah played John Churchill in the RSC's production of Helen Edmundson's Queen Anne and Scandal in the RSC production of Love for Love.

In 2019 he appeared at the Park Theatre in the Meghan Kenedy play Napoli, Brooklyn in the role of Nic Muscolino.

Filmography

Film

Television

Footnotes

References

External links

 

Living people
Scottish male soap opera actors
People educated at James Gillespie's High School
Male actors from Edinburgh
1965 births